Harry "Slim" Hersel Kinzy (July 19, 1910 – June 22, 2003) was a pitcher in Major League Baseball. He played for the Chicago White Sox.

Biography
Kinzy was born in Hallsville, Texas and played college baseball at Texas Christian University. He played his first MLB game on June 8, 1934 with the Chicago White Sox. He played in the majors for one season.

He died on June 22, 2003 in Fort Worth, Texas. He is interred in Oakland Cemetery in Dallas.

References

External links

 Baseball Almanac
 
 Baseball-Reference.Com

1910 births
2003 deaths
Major League Baseball pitchers
Chicago White Sox players
Dallas Steers players
St. Paul Saints (AA) players
Baseball players from Texas
People from Hallsville, Texas
Burials at Oakland Cemetery (Dallas, Texas)